Niekerkshoop is a town in Pixley ka Seme District Municipality in the Northern Cape province of South Africa.

It was laid out on the farm Modderfontein in 1902 and has been administered by a village management board since 1904. Named after the owners of the farm, brothers named Van Niekerk.

References

Populated places in the Siyathemba Local Municipality
Mining communities in South Africa